Gaius Quinctius Certus Poblicius Marcellus was a Roman senator active in the first quarter of the second century AD. He was suffect consul for the nundinium of May to June AD 120, with Titus Rutilius Propinquus as his colleague. The more common and shorter version of his name is Gaius Poblicius Marcellus; he is known primarily from inscriptions. He later served in Syria as the imperial legate (the province's governor).

Name 
Marcellus' polyonymous name has attracted much study. Olli Salomies, in his monograph on early imperial naming practices, notes that he "was most probably related to Publicius Certus, prefect of the aerarium Saturni in 97 ... and to Quintus Certus, a Roman knight killed in 69", and notes that Géza Alföldy suggests that Publicius Certus was Marcellus' biological father and Marcellus was adopted by a descendant of Quintus Certus. That Certus is an uncommon gentilicium further suggests the two were related. Salomies, however, concedes Marcellus could have acquired one cognomen through his mother, instead of through adoption. "But I must confess," Salomies concludes, "that I much prefer the explanation that Publicius Marcellus had been adopted by a relative."

Biography 
His cursus honorum can be reconstructed from his consulship forward from an inscription. The inscription attests that at some point after his consulate, Marcellus acquired the prestigious sacral office of augur. Other offices he held recorded in this inscription were: governor of Germania Superior, which Werner Eck dates between the year 120 and 128; and governor of Syria, which Dabrowa dates from the year 128 to 135. While governor of Syria, Marcellus was awarded triumphal ornaments for his role in crushing the Bar Kokhba revolt. One of the reasons for receiving military decoration was that the commander of the Syrian navy, Sextus Cornelius Dexter, was under the commander of the Syrian governor.

The Historia Augusta states that the emperor Hadrian forced one Marcellus to commit suicide, but Birley rejects an identification with Poblicius.

References

Further reading
 E. Dabrowa, The Governors of Roman Syria from Augustus to Septimius Severus, 1998, pp. 92-94
 Florian Matei-Pupescu, "Two fragments of Roman military diplomas discovered on the territory of the Republic of Moldova", Dacia 51 (2007), pp. 153-159
 Eck, W. - Pangerl, A, "Syria unter Domitian und Hadrian: Neue Diplome für die Auxiliartruppen der Provinz", Chiron 36 (2006), pp. 205-247
 David Macdonald, "New Fragmentary Diploma of the Syrian Army, 22 March 129", SCI 25, pp. 97-100
 Eck W. and Pangerl A, "Neue Militardiplome für die Provinzen Syria und Iudaea/Syria Palaestina", SCI 24 (2005), pp. 114-116
 Cristopher P. Jones, "Three New Letters of the Emperor Hadrian", Zeitschrift fur Papyrologie und Epigraphik 161 (2007) 145-156
 E. Dabrowa, "Hadrianic Governors of Syria: A Reapprisal", Zeitschrift fur Papyrologie und Epigraphik, 201 (2017), pp 285–291.
 E. Dabrowa, "Poblicius Marcellus and the Bar Kokhba Revolt", Rivista Storica dell'Antichita, 49 (2019), pp. 69–84.

2nd-century Roman governors of Syria
2nd-century Romans
Augurs of the Roman Empire
Bar Kokhba revolt
Quinctii
Roman governors of Germania Superior
Roman governors of Syria
Suffect consuls of Imperial Rome